Marco Quadrini (born January 30, 1979 in Rome) is an Italian former footballer who played as a defender. He played in the Serie A in one season only, collecting 12 appearances for A.S. Roma in the 1998/99 campaign. He also played for Roma in the UEFA Cup that season.

He was swapped club with Luigi Malafronte of Napoli in 2001–02 season.

References

1979 births
Living people
Italian footballers
Italy under-21 international footballers
Italy youth international footballers
Association football defenders
A.S. Roma players
Genoa C.F.C. players
Palermo F.C. players
S.S.C. Napoli players
Fermana F.C. players
Serie A players
Serie B players